Angelika Kausche (born October 7, 1962) is a German-born American politician. She is a member of the Georgia House of Representatives, affiliated with the Democratic Party, representing Georgia House District 50.

Personal life and education 
Kausche is a German-American, born in Wuppertal, who relocated to the United States in 1997 and became a naturalized American citizen in 2011. She possesses a Masters of Business Administration from the University of Trier in Germany and a Masters in Organizational Communication from Western Michigan University.

Kausche first moved to Georgia in 2015 and is involved in volunteer work as well as her local Rotary Club in Johns Creek, Georgia.

Career 
Before immigrating to the United States, Kausche had worked in German banks for several years. In the years following her relocation, Kausche taught as an adjunct professor at various colleges in both Michigan and North Carolina. Kausche is now retired.

Kausche was first elected to the Georgia House of Representatives in 2018 after an atypical campaign that saw Kausche flip her hitherto Republican district, winning by 317 votes. Kausche serves on the Environment, Higher Education, and Small Business Development committees in the Georgia House.

References 

Women state legislators in Georgia (U.S. state)
Democratic Party members of the Georgia House of Representatives
Living people
German emigrants to the United States
German bankers
Women bankers
21st-century American politicians
21st-century American women politicians
Western Michigan University alumni
University of Trier alumni
1962 births